Renato Eduardo de Oliveira Ribeiro (born 28 April 1985), known as Renato Ribeiro, is a Brazilian retired footballer who played as an attacking midfielder.

Biography 
Born in Belo Horizonte, Renato Ribeiro started his career at Atlético Mineiro. In 2006, he was signed by Corinthians, at that time associated with MSI. It was reported that MSI bought the rights of Renato. In January 2007 he joined Vasco. In summer 2007 he left for Israeli team Maccabi Haifa. In January 2009 Renato returned to Brazil, with Maccabi Haifa kept a percentage of economic rights on the player after terminating his contract which should last until 2010. He signed a 3-year contract with Cabofriense from Rio de Janeiro lower league, which acted as a proxy for the investor. He immediately left for Botafogo, also a club from Rio state. In 2010, he was signed by Esporte Clube Vitória.

On 8 January 2011 Renato Ribeiro moved to Sport Recife. In April 2011 he left for Guarani. He was released in February 2012 by Cabofriense and without a club until re-signed by Guarani in June 2012.

References

External links

weltfussball

1985 births
Living people
Brazilian footballers
Brazilian expatriate footballers
Brazil under-20 international footballers
Campeonato Brasileiro Série A players
Clube Atlético Mineiro players
Sport Club Corinthians Paulista players
CR Vasco da Gama players
Botafogo de Futebol e Regatas players
Sport Club do Recife players
Guarani FC players
Paulista Futebol Clube players
Associação Desportiva São Caetano players
Maccabi Haifa F.C. players
Expatriate footballers in Israel
Association football midfielders
Footballers from Belo Horizonte